Amantis tristis is a species of praying mantis native to Borneo.

References

tristis
Endemic fauna of Borneo
Mantodea of Asia
Insects of Indonesia
Insects of Malaysia
Insects of Brunei
Insects described in 1933